John Eliot may refer to:

John Eliot (statesman) (1592–1632), English politician
John Eliot (missionary) (c. 1604–1690), English Puritan minister and missionary
John Eliot (died 1685) (1612–1685), English politician
Sir John Eliot, 1st Baronet (1736–1786), Scottish physician
John Eliot (Royal Navy officer) (1742–1769), British naval officer and Governor of West Florida
John Eliot, 1st Earl of St Germans (1761–1823), British politician
John Eliot, 6th Earl of St Germans (1890–1922), British nobleman and army officer
John Eliot (meteorologist) (1839–1908), meteorologist

See also

John Elliot (disambiguation)
John Elliott (disambiguation)
John Eliot Historic District, Natick, Massachusetts, named in honor of the missionary
John Eliot Square District, Boston, Massachusetts, named in honor of the missionary